Mount Charlton may refer to:

 Mount Charlton (Canada), a summit in Alberta
 Mount Charlton, Queensland, a locality in the Mackay Region, Queensland, Australia